El Niño is a 2014 Spanish-French action thriller film directed by Daniel Monzón which stars Luis Tosar and Jesús Castro alongside Eduard Fernández, Sergi López, Bárbara Lennie, and Ian McShane.

Plot 
The story is set in the Strait of Gibraltar. It tells the initiation of two youngsters in the world of drug trafficking. At the same time, two police agents, specialized in dismantling drug trafficking networks, are investigating this ring.

Cast

Production
The film was produced by Telecinco Cinema, Ikiru Films and Vaca Films, alongside La Ferme! Productions, and in association with Maestranza Films. Shooting locations included Gibraltar (the Cable Car).

Release 
It premiered in Spain on 29 August 2014.

Accolades 

|-
| rowspan = "34" align = "center" | 2015
| rowspan=3 | 2nd Feroz Awards
| rowspan=2 | Best Supporting Actor
| Jesús Carroza
| 
| rowspan = "3" | 
|-
| Eduard Fernández
| 
|-
| Best Original Soundtrack
| Roque Baños
| 
|-
| rowspan = "15" | 7th Gaudí Awards || colspan = "2" | Best Film Not in the Catalan Language ||  || rowspan = "15" | 
|-
| Best Director || Daniel Monzón || 
|-
| Best Screenplay || Daniel Monzón, Jorge Guerricaechevarría || 
|-
| rowspan = "2" | Best Actor || Jesús Castro || 
|-
| Luis Tosar || 
|-
| Best Supporting Actress || Bárbara Lennie ||  
|-
| rowspan = "2" | Best Supporting Actor || Eduard Fernández ||  
|-
| Sergi López || 
|-
| Best Production Supervision || Edmon Roch, Toni Novella || 
|-
| Best Art Direction || Antón Laguna || 
|-
| Best Editing || Mapa Pastor || 
|-
| Best Original Music || Roque Baños || 
|-
| Best Cinematography || Carles Gusi || 
|-
| Best Sound || Sergio Bürmann, Oriol Tarragó, Marc Orts || 
|-
| Best Special/Digital Effects || Guillermo Orbe, David Martí, Montse Ribé, Raúl Romanillos || 
|-
| rowspan=16 | 29th Goya Awards 
| colspan=2 | Best Film
| 
| rowspan = "16 | 
|-
| Best Director
| Daniel Monzón
| 
|-
| Best Original Screenplay
| Daniel Monzón, Jorge Guerricaechevarría
| 
|-
| Best Supporting Actor
| Eduard Fernández
| 
|-
| Best Supporting Actress
| Bárbara Lennie
| 
|-
| Best New Actor
| Jesús Castro
| 
|-
| Best Cinematography
| Carles Gusi
| 
|-
| Best Editing
| Mapa Pastor
| 
|-
| Best Art Direction
| Antón Laguna
| 
|-
| Best Production Supervision
| Edmon Roch, Toni Novella
| 
|-
| Best Sound
| Sergio Bürmann, Marc Orts, Oriol Tarragó
| 
|-
| Best Special Effects
| Raúl Romanillos, Guillermo Orbe
| 
|-
| Best Costume Design
| Tatiana Hernández
| 
|-
| Best Makeup and Hairstyles
| Raquel Fidago, David Martí, Noé Montés
| 
|-
| Best Original Score
| Roque Baños
| 
|-
| Best Original Song
| "Niño sin miedo" by India Martínez, Riki Rivera, David Santisteban
| 
|}

See also 
 List of Spanish films of 2014

References

External links
 
 

2014 films
2010s Spanish-language films
2014 action thriller films
Spanish action thriller films
Films shot in Almería
Films produced by Álvaro Augustin
Films produced by Ghislain Barrois
Films produced by Edmon Roch
Films produced by Javier Ugarte
Ikiru Films films
Telecinco Cinema films
Vaca Films films
Maestranza Films films
2010s Spanish films
French action thriller films
2010s French films